Kenza Hadjar (born 24 December 1992) is an Algerian footballer who plays as a midfielder for AS Sûreté Nationale and the Algeria women's national team.

Club career
Hadjar has played for Sûreté Nationale in Algeria.

International career
Hadjar capped for Algeria at senior level during the 2021 Arab Women's Cup.

References

External links

1992 births
Living people
Algerian women's footballers
Women's association football midfielders
Algeria women's international footballers
21st-century Algerian people
Saudi Women's Premier League players